Deh-e Ahmad (also Romanized as Deh-e Aḩmad) is a village in Dust Mohammad Rural District, in the Central District of Hirmand County, Sistan and Baluchestan Province, Iran. At the 2006 census, its population was 50, in 9 families.

References 

Populated places in Hirmand County